Renpenning's syndrome is a neurodevelopmental disorder recognised in males that causes intellectual disability, mild growth retardation with examples in the testes and head, and a somewhat short stature. The condition only affects males, starting at birth.

Presentation
People with Renpenning's typically begin learning language at an ordinary pace, but by the age of 3–4 they experience a regression in mental and physical development, such as mild low muscle tone resulting in elongated faces and rapid loss in the normal growth of the head (microcephaly). Small testes and short stature are also known to commonly occur.

Genetics
It is associated with mutations in the PQBP1 gene. The gene product is a polyglutamine-binding protein involved in transcription and pre-mRNA splicing. The gene itself is located on the short arm of the X chromosome (Xp11.23). The most common mutations causing this condition occur in exon 4.

Diagnosis
This diagnosis may be suspected on clinical grounds but should be confirmed by sequencing the PQBP1 gene.

Treatment
There is no specific or curative treatment for this condition at present. Management is supportive

Epidemiology
This condition normally only occurs in males but a case in a female has been reported.

History
This condition was first characterized in 1962. and later described by Hans Renpenning in 1963 after he documented these traits on many children in one family alone.

See also
 Lujan-Fryns syndrome
 Fragile x syndrome

References

External links 

Syndromes
X-linked recessive disorders